Joan Sebastian is a Mexican singer-songwriter who has received awards and nominations for his contributions to the music industry.

American Society of Composers, Authors and Publishers Awards
The ASCAP Awards are awarded annually by the American Society of Composers, Authors and Publishers in the United States. Sebastian has received 43 awards from 43 nominations.

|-
|rowspan="2" scope="row"| 1996
|scope="row"| "Aunque Me Duele el Alma"
|rowspan="3" scope="row"| Regional Mexican
| 
|-
|scope="row"| "El Taxista"
| 
|-
|scope="row"| 1997
|scope="row"| "Duele el Amor"
| 
|-
|rowspan="2" scope="row"| 1999
|scope="row"| "Por Ti"
|scope="row"| Tex/Mex
| 
|-
|scope="row"| "Gracias Por Tanto Amor"
| Regional Mexican
| 
|-
|scope="row"| 2000
|scope="row"| Himself
|scope="row"| Silver Pen Award
| 
|-
|scope="row"| 2001
|scope="row"| "Secreto de Amor"
|Regional Mexican
| 
|-
|rowspan="3" scope="row"| 2002
|scope="row"| Himself
|Composers of the Year
| 
|-
|"Amorcito Mio"
|rowspan="2" |Regional Mexican
| 
|-
|scope="row" |"Un Idiota"
| 
|-
|rowspan="5" scope="row"| 2003
|scope="row"| Himself
|Composer of the Year
| 
|-
|"Manantial De Llanto"
|scope="row"|Pop/Ballad
| 
|-
|"25 Rosas"
|rowspan="3" |Regional Mexican
| 
|-
|"El Primer Tonto"
| 
|-
|"Más Alto Que Las Aguilas"
| 
|-
|rowspan="3" scope="row"| 2004
|scope="row"| Himself
|Songwriters of the Year
| 
|-
|"Afortunado"
|rowspan="4" |Regional Mexican
| 
|-
|"Hoy Empieza Mi Tristeza"
| 
|-
| 2005
|"Amar Como Te Amé"
| 
|-
| 2006
|"Y Las Mariposas"
| 
|-
|rowspan="3" scope="row"| 2007
|scope="row"| Himself
|Golden Note Award
| 
|-
|"De Contrabando"
|rowspan="2" |Regional Mexican
| 
|-
|scope="row" |"Oiga"
| 
|-
|rowspan="2" scope="row"| 2008
|"Eso y Más"
|rowspan="2" |Regional Mexican
| 
|-
|scope="row" |"Estos Celos"
| 
|-
|rowspan="5" scope="row"| 2009
|scope="row"| Himself
|Songwriters of the Year
| 
|-
|rowspan="2" scope="row"|"Para Siempre"
|scope="row" |Song of the Year
| 
|-
|scope="row" |Regional Mexican Song of the Year
| 
|-
|"Estos Celos"
|rowspan="2" |Regional Mexican
| 
|-
|scope="row"|"La Derrota"
| 
|-
|rowspan="3" scope="row"| 2010
|scope="row"| Himself
|Songwriters of the Year
| 
|-
|"El Último Beso"
|rowspan="9" |Regional Mexican
| 
|-
|scope="row"|"Te Irá Mejor Sin Mi"
| 
|-
|scope="row"| 2011
|scope="row"| "Estuve"
| 
|-
|rowspan="2" scope="row"| 2012
|"El Padrino"
| 
|-
|scope="row"|"No La Voy a Engañar"
| 
|-
|rowspan="3" scope="row"| 2013
|"Caminar Contigo"
| 
|-
|scope="row"|"Diséñame"
| 
|-
|scope="row"|"El Vestido Blanco"
| 
|-
|scope="row"| 2014
|"Que Dios Bendiga"
| 
|-

Billboard Latin Music Awards
The Billboard Latin Music Awards are awarded annually by the Billboard magazine in the United States. Sebastian has received 4 awards from 17 nominations.

|-
|rowspan="2" scope="row"| 2001
|scope="row"| "Secreto de Amor"
|scope="row"|Hot Latin Track of the Year
| 
|-
|scope="row"| Secreto de Amor
|rowspan="3" scope="row"|Regional Mexican Album of the Year by a Male Artist
| 
|-
| 2002
|scope="row"| En Vivo: Desde la Plaza El Progreso en Guadalajara
| 
|-
| 2003
|scope="row"| Lo Dijo el Corazón
| 
|-
|rowspan="2" scope="row"|2005
|scope="row"| Dos Grandes (with Marco Antonio Solís)
| Latin Greatest Hits Album of the Year 
| 
|-
|scope="row"| Himself
| Latin Tour of the Year
| 
|-
|rowspan="2" scope="row"|2006
|scope="row"| Inventario
| Regional Mexican Album of the Year by a Male Solo Artist
| 
|-
|scope="row"| Himself
| Billboard Latin Music Hall of Fame
| 
|-
|rowspan="4" scope="row"|2007
|rowspan="2" | "Mas Alla del Sol"
| Hot Latin Song of the Year
| 
|-
| Regional Mexican Song of the Year by a Male Solo Artist
| 
|-
|scope="row"| Mas Alla del Sol
| Regional Mexican Album of the Year by a Male Solo Artist
| 
|-
|scope="row"| Himself
| Songwriter of the Year
| 
|-
|rowspan="4" scope="row"|2009
|rowspan="2" | "Aire" (with Luz Rios)
| Hot Latin Vocal Collaboration Song of the Year
| 
|-
| Regional Mexican Song of the Year by a Female Solo Artist
| 
|-
|rowspan="5" scope="row"| Himself
| Songwriter of the Year
| 
|-
| Producer of the Year
| 
|-
|rowspan="2" scope="row"|2010
| Hot Latin Songs Artist of the Year, Male
| 
|-
| Songwriter of the Year
| 
|-
|2012
| Regional Mexican Albums Artist of the Year, Solo
| 
|-

Grammy Awards
The Grammy Awards are awarded annually by the National Academy of Recording Arts and Sciences in the United States. Sebastian has received four awards from six nominations.

|-
|rowspan="1" scope="row"| 2003
|scope="row"| Lo Dijo el Corazón
|rowspan="2" scope="row"|Best Mexican/Mexican-American Album
| 
|-
|rowspan="1" scope="row"| 2004
|scope="row"| Afortunado
| 
|-
|rowspan="1" scope="row"| 2007
|scope="row"| Más Allá del Sol
|rowspan="2" scope="row"|Best Banda Album
| 
|-
|rowspan="1" scope="row"| 2009
|scope="row"| No es de Madera
| 
|-
|rowspan="1" scope="row"| 2012
|scope="row"| Huevos Rancheros
|rowspan="2" scope="row"|Best Regional Mexican Music Album (including Tejano)
| 
|-
|rowspan="1" scope="row"| 2014
|scope="row"| 13 Celebrando el 13
| 
|-

Latin Grammy Awards
The Latin Grammy Awards are awarded annually by the Latin Academy of Recording Arts & Sciences in the United States. Sebastian has received

Lo Nuestro Awards
The Lo Nuestro Awards are awarded annually by television network Univision in the United States. Sebastian has received thirteen awards from twenty-nine nominations.

|-
|rowspan="2" scope="row"| 1989
|scope="row"| Himself
|scope="row"| Regional Mexican Artist of the Year
| 
|-
|scope="row"| Alberto Vázquez and Joan Sebastian
|scope="row"| Pop Group of the Year
| 
|-
|scope="row"| 1990
|scope="row"| Himself
|scope="row"| Regional Mexican Artist of the Year
| 
|-
|scope="row"| 1994
|scope="row"| Himself
|scope="row"| Regional Mexican Male Artist of the Year
| 
|-
|scope="row"| 1999
|scope="row"| Himself
|scope="row"| Regional Mexican Male Artist of the Year
| 
|-
|rowspan="5" scope="row"| 2001
|scope="row"| Secreto de Amor
|scope="row"| Regional Mexican Album of the Year
| 
|-
|scope="row"| "Secreto de Amor"
|scope="row"| Regional Mexican Song of the Year
| 
|-
|rowspan="3" scope="row"|Himself 
|scope="row"| Regional Mexican Male Artist of the Year
| 
|-
|scope="row"| Grupero Artist of the Year
| 
|-
|scope="row"| Excellence Award
| 
|-
|rowspan="3" scope="row"| 2002
|scope="row"| En Vivo: Desde la Plaza El Progreso en Guadalajara
|scope="row"| 
| 
|-
|rowspan="2" scope="row"|Himself 
|scope="row"| Regional Mexican Male Artist of the Year
| 
|-
|scope="row"| Grupero Artist of the Year
| 
|-

References

Sebastian, Joan